Heidrick may refer to:

Heidrick, Kentucky, an unincorporated community located in Knox County
Emmet Heidrick (1876–1916), American baseball outfielder